Petito is an Italian surname. 

Notable people with the surname include:

 Antonio Petito (1822–1876), Italian actor and playwright
 Enzo Petito (1897–1967), Italian actor
 Gabby Petito (1999–2021), American homicide victim
 Giuseppe Petito (born 1960), Italian cyclist
 Roberto Petito (born 1971), Italian cyclist

Italian-language surnames